Sucumbíos Canton is a canton of Ecuador, located in the Sucumbíos Province.  Its capital is the town of La Bonita.  Its population at the 2001 census was 2,836.

References

Cantons of Sucumbíos Province